A North Tyneside mayoral election was held in 2021. The Mayor of North Tyneside Norma Redfearn was seeking re-election.

Candidates 

Majority: 13,353

References 

Metropolitan Borough of North Tyneside
2021 English local elections
21st century in Tyne and Wear